Stolyarov (feminine: Stolyarova) is a Russian language occupational surname derived from the word stolyar ("carpenter") and literally meaning "descendant of carpenter". The surname may also be transliterated as Stoliarov, Stoljarov, Stoliaroff, etc. The Lithuanianized form is Stoliarovas.

Notable people with this surname include:

 Andrei Stoliarov, Russian tennis player
 Arty (musician), real name: Artyom Stolyarov
 Dmitri Stolyarov
 Ekaterina Stolyarova
 Gennady Stolyarov
 Hélène Stoliaroff, birth name of Hélène Chanel, French actress
Irina Stolyarova
 Sergei Stolyarov, Soviet Russian film actor
 Valeri Stolyarov

Russian-language surnames
Occupational surnames